The 2022–23 Men's Hoofdklasse Hockey, also known as the Tulp Hoofdklasse Men for sponsorship reasons, was the 50th season of the Men's Hoofdklasse Hockey, the top Dutch field hockey league. It began on 3 September 2022 and will conclude on 29 May 2023 with the second match of the championship final.

Bloemendaal are the three-time defending champions.

Changes from 2021–22
Starting from this season all the matches in the Hoofdklasse will be played in four quarters of 15 minutes in accordance with the international rules of hockey; previously, the quarters were 17.5 minutes. Originally, the championship final would be played over one match at the Wagener Stadium in Amstelveen instead of the best of three home and away series as the previous seasons. The semi-finals of the play-offs would remain a best of three series. After consultation with the Hoofdklasse clubs, it was decided to play both the semi-final and final rounds in two games: one home and one away.

Teams

Twelve teams are competing in the league - the top nine teams from the previous season, the winner of the 2021–22 Promotieklasse and the two winners of the 2021–22 relegation play-offs. Schaerweijde won the 2021–22 Promotieklasse and replaced Hurley, while HDM and Voordaan were promoted after beating SCHC and Tilburg in the relegation play-offs.

Accommodation and locations

Number of teams by province

Regular season

Standings

Results

Top goalscorers

References

Men's Hoofdklasse Hockey
Hoofdklasse
Hoofdklasse Hockey Men
Hoofdklasse Hockey Men
Hoofdklasse